The World Allround Speed Skating Championships for Men took place on 19 and 20 February 1972 in Oslo at the Bislett stadion ice rink.

The title holder and winner was Ard Schenk who prolonged his title to become the third speed skater to win the world allround title three times in a row, equaling the performances of Oscar Mathisen and Hjalmar Andersen.

Classification

 :  DNS = Did not start

Source:

Attribution
In Dutch

References 

World Allround Speed Skating Championships, 1972
1972 World Allround